Zhumeria is a genus of flowering plant in the family Lamiaceae, first described in 1967. It contains only one known species, Zhumeria majdae, endemic to Iran.

References

Lamiaceae
Endemic flora of Iran
Monotypic Lamiaceae genera